Matthew Mark Bollant (born March 13, 1971) is the head coach for the Eastern Illinois Panthers women's basketball team. Previously, he served as the head women's basketball coach at the University of Illinois,  and before that, he served as head coach of the University of Wisconsin-Green Bay Phoenix women's basketball team. In 2011, he led the Phoenix to its first Sweet Sixteen appearance.  He came to the Phoenix after serving as the head coach at Bryan College for five seasons and as an assistant coach at Indiana and Evansville for two and one seasons, respectively.

Head coaching record
Sources:

 OVC 2017–18 Women's Basketball Standings

References

External links
 Eastern Illinois bio
 Illinois bio

1971 births
Living people
American InterContinental University alumni
American women's basketball coaches
Bryan Lions women's basketball coaches
Eastern Illinois Panthers women's basketball coaches
Evansville Purple Aces women's basketball coaches
Green Bay Phoenix women's basketball coaches
Illinois Fighting Illini women's basketball coaches
Indiana Hoosiers women's basketball coaches
Place of birth missing (living people)
Winona State University alumni